Eva von Leiningen-Westerburg (1481-1543), was a suo jure ruling countess regnant of Leiningen from 1523 to 1543.

References

16th-century women rulers
16th-century German women
1481 births
1543 deaths